The small wedge-toed gecko (Gehyra spheniscus) is a species of gecko endemic to  Western Australia.

References

Gehyra
Reptiles described in 2012
Geckos of Australia